Kingswood Football Club was a former Australian rules football club based at Kingswood, South Australia that folded following the 1991 South Australian Amateur Football League (SAAFL) season.

History 
The club was initially formed as a workplace club called the National Bank Amateur Football Club in 1971 and joined the South Australian Amateur Football League, with the first committee meeting held on 15 February 1971, and based at Park 19 (Pityarilla) in the South Parklands.  The club relocated to Kingswood Oval in 1981 and adjusted its name to National Australia Bank Group Football Club in 1984.  The club renamed itself to the Kingswood Football Club in 1991 to appeal to a wider market, but this name was short-lived as the club folded at the end of that season.

A-Grade Premierships 
 South Australian Amateur Football League A4 (1)
 1976 
 South Australian Amateur Football League A5 (1)
 1975 
 South Australian Amateur Football League A7 (1)
 1971
 1984

References 

Australian rules football clubs in South Australia
1971 establishments in Australia
1991 disestablishments in Australia
Australian rules football clubs established in 1971
Australian rules football clubs disestablished in 1991